Condormarca or Kunturmarka (Quechua kuntur condor, marka village) is one of six districts of the province of Bolívar in Peru.

References